Tutesk (also Romanized as Tūtesk and Tūtisk; also known as Tutsak) is a village in Arabkhaneh Rural District, Shusef District, Nehbandan County, South Khorasan Province, Iran. At the 2006 census, its population was 148, in 43 families.

References 

Populated places in Nehbandan County